North New Hyde Park is a hamlet and census-designated place (CDP) in the Town of North Hempstead in Nassau County, on Long Island, in New York, United States. The population was 14,899 at the 2010 census. 

Portions of the area are also known as Floral Park Centre and Lakeville Estates.

History 
The hamlet's name reflects the fact that it is located immediately north of New Hyde Park.

Geography

As aforementioned, the areas known as Floral Park Centre and Lakeville Estates are located within the boundaries of North New Hyde Park.

Demographics

2010 census 
As of the census of 2010, there were 14,889 people residing in the CDP. The racial makeup of the CDP was 65.67% White, 0.72% African American, 0.26% Native American, 29.14% Asian, 0% Pacific Islander, 2.04% from other races, and 2.16% from two or more races. Hispanic or Latino of any race were 7.24% of the population.

Census 2000 
As of the census of 2000, there were 14,542 people, 5,032 households, and 4,055 families residing in the CDP. The population density was 7,350.1 per square mile (2,835.7/km2). There were 5,116 housing units at an average density of 2,585.8/sq mi (997.6/km2). The racial makeup of the CDP was 82.38% White, 0.33% African American, 0.14% Native American, 14.83% Asian, 0.02% Pacific Islander, 1.22% from other races, and 1.07% from two or more races. Hispanic or Latino of any race were 4.86% of the population.

There were 5,032 households, out of which 32.5% had children under the age of 18 living with them, 68.9% were married couples living together, 9.0% had a female householder with no husband present, and 19.4% were non-families. 17.9% of all households were made up of individuals, and 12.0% had someone living alone who was 65 years of age or older. The average household size was 2.89 and the average family size was 3.28.

In the CDP, the population was spread out, with 22.0% under the age of 18, 6.5% from 18 to 24, 25.4% from 25 to 44, 26.5% from 45 to 64, and 19.7% who were 65 years of age or older. The median age was 43 years. For every 100 females, there were 89.9 males. For every 100 females age 18 and over, there were 87.4 males.

The median income for a household in the CDP was $69,792, and the median income for a family was $80,688. Males had a median income of $53,667 versus $42,162 for females. The per capita income for the CDP was $31,998. About 1.8% of families and 2.7% of the population were below the poverty line, including 3.1% of those under age 18 and 4.0% of those age 65 or over.

Notable person 

 Michael J. Tully, Jr. – Former New York State Senator and Supervisor of the Town of North Hempstead; lived at 113 Patton Boulevard.

See also
 New Hyde Park (Village), New York

References

External Links 

 Greater New Hyde Park Chamber of Commerce official website

Census-designated places in New York (state)
Town of North Hempstead, New York
Census-designated places in Nassau County, New York